This is a list of episodes for Season 2 of Late Night with Conan O'Brien, which aired from September 13, 1994, to September 8, 1995.

Series overview

Season 2

References

Episodes (season 02)